Jani Sutelainen (born 24 June 1985), professionally known as Aste (in English Degree) and previously as Asteriks, is a Finnish rapper who has labeled his music as "crime-pop".  He has released six solo studio albums and appeared as a featured guest on songs by such artists as Pyhimys and Antti Tuisku.

Selected discography

Solo albums

Singles

References

Living people
Finnish rappers
Finnish hip hop musicians
1985 births